Mecodema kokoroiho is a large-bodied ground beetle that is endemic to Warawara Forest Park, Pawarenga, Northland, New Zealand. The species name (etymology) was provided by Te Rarawa  Joseph Cooper, Waipuna marae, Panguru, Northland. The specific name kokoroiho means ‘a beetle found with the fern root’.

Description 
The species is 27–34 mm in length, with a pronotal width of 6.5–9 mm and an elytral width of 8–11 mm. The body is matte to glossy black, the coxae and femur are dark reddish-brown, and the tibiae black. M. kokoroiho is distinguished from other North Island Mecodema species by:

 vertexal groove broad and shallow with a few scattered, obsolescent punctures and rugose wrinkles laterally; 
 the pronotal foveae deep and narrow (distinctly formed by posterior sinuation); 
 intervals 1 and 7 continued to base; 
 distinctive shape of the apical portion of the penis lobe.

Ecology 
The adults of M. kokoroiho are readily found at night along the edges of mixed broadleaf forest, but are not as common in areas of Warawara Forest that have high kauri (Agathis australis) densities.

References 

kokoroiho
Beetles described in 2019